Peter Kingsley Archer, Baron Archer of Sandwell,  (20 November 1926 – 14 June 2012), was a British lawyer and Labour Party politician. He was a Member of Parliament from 1966 until 1992, when he became a life peer. Between 1974 and 1979 he was Solicitor General for England and Wales.

Early life and education
Archer was born in Wednesbury, Staffordshire on 20 November 1926. He left school at 16 and became a clerk for the Ministry of Health before spending four years working in coal mines under the Bevin Boys scheme. He subsequently obtained degrees in Philosophy and Law at the London School of Economics and University College London, and was called to the Bar at Gray's Inn in 1952.

Career
Archer joined the Labour Party in 1947. He was selected in 1957 as the candidate for the Hendon South parliamentary seat, which he unsuccessfully contested in 1959 after declining to contest the 1957 by-election for his home area of Wednesbury. After contesting Brierley Hill in 1964, he was returned for Rowley Regis and Tipton in 1966. He served as Parliamentary Private Secretary to the Attorney General Sir Elwyn Jones (1967–1970) and in 1969 was the British representative on the United Nations' "third committee" on human rights.

While in opposition, Archer was a member of the All-Party Group for World Government (1970–1974), was appointed Queen's Counsel in 1971 and between 1971 and 1974 was Chair of Amnesty International's UK Section; he was a founder member of the Amnesty International Committee in 1961.

After boundary changes for the February 1974 election, Archer was returned for Warley West. In the new Labour government, led by Harold Wilson and then James Callaghan, he was appointed Solicitor General, a post he held until 1979. Archer and his colleague Attorney General Sam Silkin declined knighthoods, which was customary for individuals appointed to these positions. He was sworn of the Privy Council in 1977. In opposition, he was spokesman for legal affairs (1979–1982), Shadow Trade Secretary (1982–1983), and Shadow Secretary of State for Northern Ireland (1983–1987) under Neil Kinnock. He was also appointed a Recorder of the Crown Court in 1982. He stood down at the 1992 general election and subsequently received a life peerage as Baron Archer of Sandwell, of Sandwell in the County of West Midlands in 1992.

From 1992 to 1999 he was Chairman of the Council on Tribunals. In the House of Lords, in 1998 he successfully proposed an amendment to the Crime and Disorder Bill which abolished the death penalty for treason. The same year, he was appointed chair of the Enemy Property Claims Assessment Panel, a compensation fund for claims from families of Holocaust victims whose assets in Britain had been seized. He also chaired an independent inquiry which began in 2007 and reported in 2009, into how people had been given contaminated blood.

He was described as being an "extremely active" member of the Fabian Society, sitting on their executive committee between 1974 and 1986 and was chairman between 1980 and 1981. From 1993 until his death, he was their President, and over the same period served as President of Uniting for Peace (formerly the World Disarmament Campaign), and of the One World Trust.

A Methodist, he married Margaret Smith in 1954 and they had one son.

Character
Archer was described as being a "vigorous campaigner" for human rights who had a commitment to world government. Paying tribute to him in The Independent, Tam Dalyell said: "Archer was one of those rare politicians who made judgements and whose actions followed what he believed to be right and eschewed what was wrong. ... Archer was an idealist, but an idealist with his feet on the ground, commanding respect and using every moment of his long public life constructively."

Publications

References

External links 

1926 births
2012 deaths
Alumni of University College London
Alumni of the London School of Economics
Bevin Boys
Members of Gray's Inn
English King's Counsel
Archer of Sandwell
Labour Party (UK) MPs for English constituencies
Archer of Sandwell, Peter Archer, Baron
Solicitors General for England and Wales
UK MPs 1966–1970
UK MPs 1970–1974
UK MPs 1974
UK MPs 1974–1979
UK MPs 1979–1983
UK MPs 1983–1987
UK MPs 1987–1992
Chairs of the Fabian Society
Presidents of the Fabian Society
Life peers created by Elizabeth II